Fame is the second studio album by Grace Jones, released on 7 June 1978 by Island Records.

Background, production and release
After relative success with her debut release, Grace Jones and Tom Moulton delivered a rapid follow-up album to Portfolio. Fame, recorded in Sigma Sound Studios in Philadelphia, consisted of a set of mainstream-oriented disco tracks and repeated the scheme of the previous album. Like on Portfolio, side A was a continuous medley, and side B again opened with a re-interpretation of a French classic, this time it was Jacques Prévert's "Les Feuilles mortes", sung in English as "Autumn Leaves". The album was "dedicated with love to a true Artist, Jean-Paul Goude", as Jones put it in the liner notes.

The Canadian edition of the original vinyl album included another French language track, "Comme un oiseau qui s'envole", which replaced "All on a Summers Night" and, in most other territories, was issued as the B-side of the single "Do or Die". On the Japanese version of the album "Comme un oiseau qui s'envole" replaced "Below the Belt", which in turn in Italy was omitted in favour of an Italian song, "Anema e core". A number of songs from the album, including  "Anema e core", have been performed in Italian TV show Stryx, which ran in late 1978.

The album was a hit on the North American club scene, and the "Do or Die"/"Pride"/"Fame" side reached top 10 on both the U.S. Hot Dance Club Play and Canadian Dance/Urban charts. Fame also charted respectably in Italy and Sweden which were Jones' most successful markets during the disco era. The album was issued in CD format in the early 1990s, but soon went out of print. It was not available in any digital format until November 2011, when it received an official remastered CD release by Gold Legion, a record company that specializes in reissuing classic disco albums on CD. The re-release came with no bonus tracks. It was first released on CD in the UK in 2015, along with Portfolio and Muse, as part of the Disco boxed set of Jones' first three "disco" era albums. Each album in the set came with seven bonus tracks.

Singles
"Do or Die" was the album's lead single and became a big club hit on the U.S. and Canadian dance charts. "Autumn Leaves" was released on a single with the song "Anema e core" from the Italian pressing of Fame. Although being the B-side track, "Anema e core" is strangely identified as the single's title on the cover.

"Fame" and "Am I Ever Gonna Fall in Love in New York City" also got single releases, but failed to chart.

Track listing
Note: Tracks from side A are a non-stop medley, with the total playing time 18:47.

Standard release

Canadian release

Italian release

Charts

Singles

Personnel
 Keith Benson – drums
 Richard Bernstein – artwork design
 John Davis – arrangements, keyboards
 Grace Jones – lead vocals
 Francis Jug – photography
 Sonia Moskewitz – photography
 Moto – tambourines
 Piggy Pigerino – violin
 Don Renaldo – strings, horns
 José Rodriguez – mastering
 Darrell Rogers – recording and mixing assistance
 Arthur Stoppe – recording and mixing engineering
 Sweethearts of Sigma (Carla Benson, Yvette Benton, Barbara Ingram) – background vocals
 Neil Terk – art direction
 Larry Washington – congas, percussion
 Jimmy Williams – bass guitar

Release history

References

External links
 Fame on Allmusic
 Fame on Discogs
 Fame on Rate Your Music

1978 albums
Grace Jones albums
Albums produced by Tom Moulton
Albums recorded at Sigma Sound Studios
Island Records albums